Cove LRT station is an elevated Light Rail Transit (LRT) station on the Punggol LRT line East Loop in Punggol, Singapore, located at Punggol Field between the junctions of Punggol Road and Edgefield Plains. It was opened on 29 January 2005 together with the Sengkang LRT West Loop.

Etymology

The name is believed to be taken from the name of Punggol Cove Residents' Committee (RC) located near the station. The station's Chinese name, "海湾", was initially the same as the proposed Chinese name for Bayfront MRT station. However, to avoid possible confusion between these two stations, it was later decided that the Chinese name for Bayfront station would be "海湾舫" instead.

References

External links

Railway stations in Singapore opened in 2005
Railway stations in Punggol
Punggol
LRT stations in Punggol
Light Rail Transit (Singapore) stations